Tamara Lea Doering is an American microbiologist known for her research in Cryptococcus neoformans, a pathogenic fungus. She is currently a professor of molecular microbiology at Washington University School of Medicine.

Early life and education 

Doering earned her bachelor's degree with honors from Johns Hopkins University in 1983. She completed the Medical Scientist Training Program at Johns Hopkins School of Medicine, earning her MD PhD in 1991. Under the supervision of Paul Englund and Gerald W. Hart, she conducted her doctoral research on the biosynthesis of GPI anchors in African trypanosomes.

Career and research 
After receiving her doctorate degree, Doering continued her training as a postdoctoral fellow at the University of California, Berkeley with Randy Schekman, where she studied the intracellular transport of GPI-anchored proteins in the model yeast Saccharomyces cerevisiae.

In 1997, Doering became an assistant professor of pharmacology at Cornell University Medical College. In 1999, she joined the faculty of Washington University Medical School. Doering became a professor of molecular microbiology in 2011. Currently, she is the Alumni Endowed Professor of Molecular Microbiology at the Washington University Medical School.

Doering's research focuses on the fundamental biology and host interactions of Cryptococcus neoformans, a pathogenic fungus that primarily causes meningoencephalitis in immunocompromised individuals. One area of research in her lab is the polysaccharide capsule which surrounds the surface of C. neoformans and is the main cryptococcal virulence factor. Her lab studies capsule biosynthesis, as well as the synthesis of other glycoconjugates. 

The Doering lab also studies host interactions of C. neoformans as well as regulation of capsule synthesis.

Awards and Honors 

 President, Academic Women’s Network of Washington University Medical School (2015-2016)
 External Advisory Committee, National Center for Functional Glycomics (2014 - )
 Alumni Endowed Professorship, Washington University Medical School (2013 - )
 Fellow, American Academy of Microbiology (2013)
 Advisory Committee, Burroughs Wellcome Fund Career Awards for Medical Scientists (2011-2019)
 Fellow, American Association for the Advancement of Science (2010)
 Steering Committee, Consortium for Functional Glycomics (2007-2012)
 Advisory Board Member, European Consortium for Fungal Cell Wall (2005-2008)
 Member, American Society for Clinical Investigation (2005)
 Mentor Award, Academic Women’s Network (2004)
 Craig Faculty Fellowship, Washington University School of Medicine (2000-2005)
 Burroughs Wellcome New Investigator Award in Molecular Pathogenic Mycology (2000-2003)
 Burroughs Wellcome Career Award in the Biomedical Sciences (1996-2000)
 Miller Institute Fellowship Award for Basic Research in Science (1993-1995)
 National Institutes of Health Postdoctoral Fellowship Award (1993)

References 

Year of birth missing (living people)
Living people
American microbiologists
Women microbiologists
21st-century American biologists
American women biologists
University of Washington faculty
20th-century American women scientists
Weill Medical College of Cornell University faculty
21st-century American women scientists
Fellows of the American Association for the Advancement of Science
20th-century American biologists
Fellows of the American Academy of Microbiology